The Z15/16 Beijing-Harbin Through Train is a non-stop express train between Beijing and Harbin, capital of the Heilongjiang province, operated by Harbin Railway Bureau using 25T soft sleeper carriages. The 1249 km journey spans across the entire Beijing–Harbin railway. The train from Beijing railway station to Harbin West railway station is numbered Z15, with a journey time of 9 hours and 58 minutes; while the train in the opposite direction is numbered Z16, with a journey time of 9 hours and 54 minutes.

Launch and development 
In 2004, as part of the fifth "Speed-Up campaign" by the Ministry of Railways, 19 pairs of non-stop express trains were launched, most of them along the Beijing-Harbin Railway and Beijing-Shanghai Railway. These trains would depart at night and arrive at the terminus the next morning.  Among them were the Z15/16 Beijing-Harbin through train, operated by Harbin Railway Bureau. At that time, one way journey took 10 hours and 30 minutes, which was further compressed to 9 hours and 44 minutes in 2008. The route was favoured by many passengers, with its load factor reaching 90% just a month after its launch.

In 2017, the route was amended to originate from and terminate at Harbin West railway station, as Harbin railway station undergoes renovation works.

Carriages
Currently, the route uses 25T soft sleeper carriages built by Bombardier Sifang Power (Qingdao) Transportation Ltd. in 2003, with a power supply mode of AC380V.

Locomotive 
Due to the unique power supply mode of the carriages, the DF11G diesel locomotive is utilised throughout the entire journey, with a technical stop at Shenyang North railway station for a change of drivers.

Schedule
Updated as of 10 April 2018.

See also 
Z17/18 Beijing-Harbin Through Train
Z203/204 Beijing-Harbin Through Train
D27/28 Beijing-Harbin Through Train
D101/102 Beijing-Harbin Through Train
G381/382 Beijing-Harbin Through Train
G393/394 Beijing-Harbin Through Train

References 

Passenger rail transport in China
Rail transport in Beijing
Rail transport in Heilongjiang